The pungent pipistrelle (Hypsugo mordax) is a species of vesper bat in the family Vespertilionidae. It is found in Indonesia and possibly the Philippines.

Formerly classified in the genus Falsistrellus, phylogenetic evidence supports it belonging to the genus Hypsugo.

Sources

Hypsugo
Mammals described in 1866
Taxa named by Wilhelm Peters
Bats of Indonesia
Bats of Southeast Asia
Taxonomy articles created by Polbot
Taxobox binomials not recognized by IUCN